The 1961 North Texas State Eagles football team was an American football team that represented North Texas State University (now known as the University of North Texas) during the 1961 NCAA University Division football season as a member of the Missouri Valley Conference. In their 16th year under head coach Odus Mitchell, the team compiled a 5–4–1 record.

Schedule

References

North Texas State
North Texas Mean Green football seasons
North Texas State Mean Green football